Albert Wardell (born ) was a Welsh professional footballer who played for Newport County and represented the Wales national football team.

Wardell was the son of John Wardell and was either born in Newport, Monmouthshire or Bilston, South Staffordshire.

In 1929, Wardell, 21, was selected for the Football Association of Wales tour of Canada but these matches were not classed as international cap matches. His Newport County teammate Bob Pugh was also selected for the tour.

He signed with Darlington F.C. in 1930.

References

Welsh footballers
Newport County A.F.C. players
English Football League players
Wales amateur international footballers
Association football forwards
1900s births
Year of death missing
Year of birth uncertain